Stockton State Park is a public recreation area occupying  on the shore of Stockton Lake,  south of Stockton, Missouri. The state park occupies a northward jutting peninsula between the Big Sac and Little Sac arms of the  lake, which was created when the U.S. Army Corps of Engineers dammed the Sac River in 1969.

Activities and amenities
The park provides recreation that includes fishing, swimming, skiing, scuba diving, and sailing. The park's marina has two boat ramps and more than 300 stalls, some assigned exclusively to sailboats. There are also picnicking areas, campgrounds, and camper cabins.

References

External links
Stockton State Park Missouri Department of Natural Resources
Stockton State Park Map Missouri Department of Natural Resources

State parks of Missouri
Protected areas of Cedar County, Missouri
Protected areas established in 1969